Xuanhua is an urban district of Zhangjiakou in northwestern Hebei Province, China.

Xuanhua is a very old city with a rich military and agricultural history. As a city with a large garrison close to the capital, it was strategically vital. It now has a population of 274,000 people. In modern times it has also become an industrial area, and now contains a high-tech development zone where new developments are being promoted by the government of Hebei Province.

History
The remains of the Kingdom of Yan era city of Zaoyang (造陽) can be located in the northeast of Xuanhua District

Xuanhua is home to a Liao (10th-12th c.) tomb with a colored star atlas painted with 268 stars including the sun, the moon, and the five planets Mercury, Venus, Mars, Jupiter, and Saturn.

In the late 14th century, prior to his elevation to emperor of the Ming Empire, Zhu Di ruled his principality of Yan from Xuanhua. Under the Qing, it continued to serve as the seat of a prefecture and was known to the Jesuit missionaries as "Suen-hao-fou".

In January 2016, the former rural Xuanhua County surrounding the urban Xuanhua merged with the urban Xuanhua District to established Greater Xuanhua District with both rural and urban area combined.

Military
Xuanhua was the garrison headquarters for the soldiers on the Xuanda-Shanxi Military Area, one of the three military governorships of the Great Wall in the Ming Dynasty. It commanded Xuanfu Zhen, Datong Zhen, and Shanxi Zhen along the Great Wall.

Xuanhua has a set of city walls built in the Ming Dynasty which are still partly intact.

Agriculture

Known in ancient times as "The Grape Town," Xuanhua farmers grow a wide variety of grapes. Some grapes are used for wine production, but much of the crop is sold as fruit. In autumn, a large number of farmers sell grapes on streetsides out of hand-carts or trucks.

Industry

Xuanhua contains 
 coal
 iron
 gold
 amargosite
 rich shale
 dolomite
 bentonite - Xuanhua has one of the largest deposits of bentonite in China.
and other mineral resources.

Its key industries are 
 metallurgy
 machinery manufacturing
 chemical production
 electrical power generation
 papermaking
 woolskin tanning
and
 brewing - the locally produced beer is "Zhōnglóu Píjiǔ" or Bell-tower Beer.

Administrative divisions
Subdistricts:
Tianqinsi Subdistrict, Huangcheng Subdistrict, Nanguan Subdistrict, Nanda Avenue Subdistrict, Dabei Avenue Subdistrict, Gongye Avenue Subdistrict, Jianguo Avenue Subdistrict

Towns:
 Pangjiabu Town, Yanghenan Town, Shenjing Town, Guocun Town, Jiajiaying Town, Gujiaying Town, Zhaochuan Town

Townships:
Hezixi Township, Chunguang Township, Houjiamiao Township, Wangjiawan Township, Tarcun Township, Jiangjiatun Township, Lijiabu Township

Climate

References

Citations

Bibliography
 
 
 

County-level divisions of Hebei
Zhangjiakou